The 671st Radar Squadron is an inactive United States Air Force unit. It was last assigned to the 20th Air Division, Aerospace Defense Command, stationed at Naval Air Station Key West, Florida. It was last active in 1980.

The unit was a General Surveillance Radar squadron providing for the air defense of the United States.

Lineage
 671st Radar Squadron
 Constituted as the 671st Aircraft Control and Warning Squadron and activated
 Organized on 1 June 1962
 Redesignated 671st Radar Squadron (SAGE) on 15 June 1965
 Redesignated 671st Radar Squadron on 1 February 1974
 Inactivated 30 June 1980

Assignments
 Air Defense Command (not organized)
 Montgomery Air Defense Sector, 1 June 1962
 32d Air Division, 1 April 1966
 33d Air Division, 14 November 1969
 20th Air Division, 19 November 1969 – 30 June 1980

Stations
 Naval Air Station Key West, Florida, 1 June 1962 – 30 June 1980

References

Notes
 Explanatory notes

 Citations

Bibliography
 
  
 
  US Army Construction Engineering Research Laboratories, Champaign, IL (1997).
 Further reading
 

Radar squadrons of the United States Air Force
Aerospace Defense Command units